"Charms" is a 1963 song written by Helen Miller and Howard Greenfield.  The song was produced by Snuff Garrett and arranged by Ernie Freeman, and performed by Bobby Vee featuring the Johnny Mann Singers.  "Charms" reached #5 on the Easy Listening chart and #13 on the Billboard Hot 100. Outside the US, the song peaked at #15 in Canada.

The single's B-side, "Bobby Tomorrow", reached #21 in the United Kingdom.

Other versions
Rob de Nijs and The Lords released a version as the B-side to their single "How Do You Do It?" in June 1963 in the Netherlands.

References

1963 songs
1963 singles
Songs written by Helen Miller (songwriter)
Songs with lyrics by Howard Greenfield
Bobby Vee songs
Song recordings produced by Snuff Garrett
Liberty Records singles